Alchemilla stricta is a species of lady's mantle that is endemic to Turkey. It is only known from five locations; around Kağızman, Lake Abant, Sarıkamış, Karagöl-Sahara and the Efeler forest. It is found in marshy ground by lakes or streams.

References

stricta
Endemic flora of Turkey